The Nant y Cynnyd is a small river in Gwynedd, north Wales, starting near the Pen-y-Gwryd hotel near Capel Curig.  The Ordnance Survey map is not completely specific, but the river grows into Afon Glaslyn and into Llyn Gwynant.

External links
OS map location

Beddgelert
Rivers of Gwynedd
Rivers of Snowdonia